Andrea Escobar (born July 22, 1992) is a 

Colombian actress, television hostess, and model.

Andrea is the oldest of two in her family, her brother one year younger is a chef, native of San Juan Bautista de Guacari.

Andrea is a Colombian super model based in the USA. She won the Elite Model Look Colombia 2003, being number 16 over 75 countries with more than 100 contestants on the finals of Elite model look held in Singapore. She returned to Colombia and signed a contract with Stock Models in Bogota. A year later was scouted by the agency Michelle Pommier (Miami) in Colombia and moved to Miami. Later that year she changed her agency to Joy Front Management, her current agency.

Her list of clients includes an exclusive show of Roberto Cavalli's birthday party as her first job in the USA. She has worked with major designers like Agata Ruiz De La Prada, Adolfo Dominguez, Custo Barcelona, Marck Jacobs, Bvlgary, Cartier, American Eagle,  Rosa Cha, La Martina, MAC cosmetics, Diesel, Cosmopolitan Magazine, Avanti, South Pole, Gab, Tommy Hilfiger, Sauvage, Beats by Dr Dre, Gottex, Steve Madden, Federciks of Hollywood, YSL, and Victoria's Secret.

Andrea has participated in music videos with artists like Luis Fonsi, Romeo Santos, Ludacris, Pharrell Williams, Lil Wayne, Wycleft, T.I, Timbaland, Pitbull, and David Guetta.

She also was the cover of Diners magazine in August 2004, the cover of Vitalika for the month of July in 2009, and one of the most famous magazines in her home Country made her a tribute "Revista Don Juan" having her as the cover of the month of August in 2013. She has appeared on the pages of Infashion (Colombia), Fuscia (Colombia), Caras (Colombia), Novias (Colombia), Revista TV & Novelas (Colombia), Miss & Bliss (Brazil), Eres (Mexico), & (Miami), Ocean drive (Miami), Dmag (Argentina), Venue magazine (Miami), Esquire Latin America (South and Central America), Esquire magazine (Colombia) among others around the globe.

Andrea is also active in helping others in 2004 was part of a campaign with the name of "Cartagena look 2004" to raise money getting help for those affected by the rain in Colombia. She collaborates with Amigos For Kids and Little Lighthouse Foundation.
 
Winner of Colombia, Elite model look 2003, held in Colombia. 
TV host of fashion TV CaliExposhow 2004, Cali, valle del cauca, Colombia.
TV host for Fashion TV Mercedez Benz fashion week 2005, Mexico.
Winner of Colombia, Miss Beauty of the world Colombia pageant 2010, held in Colombia.
Winner of Miss Beauty of South America, Miss Beauty of the World Pageant 2010, held in China.
Voted one of the most beautiful women for People in espanol.
She is one of the favorites models on the pages of HM magazine in Mexico.

She won the award Modelo TV & Novelas, 2004 for being the best model of that year.
She was the 'modelo revelacion' of the Caliexposhow in 2004.

Her debut in acting was done in Colombia for Pasion de Gavilanes in 2003.
She haves done a couple of episodes of Burn Notice, CSI Miami and CSI LA. Film in Miami between 2005 – 2008 
Andrea landed a reoccurring role on the popular TV series novela Aurora (telenovela) from 2010 to 2011. 
She also did a small part on the movie 'Rock of Ages' next to Tom Cruise and Catherine Zeta-Jones in 2012.
Later on landed a guest act in La Gata (telenovela) in 2014
She just ended filming Ballers an HBO series that airs on Jun 2015.

She has studied acting for many years starting in her country with big names like Alfonso Ortiz, Vicky Hernandez, Sergio Cabrera and he's wife Florina Lemetre, ones in Miami she prepared with Sebastian Ligarde, Roberto Huicochea, Adela romero, she is currently moving to NYC in May (for the summer) to study acting at the New York film academy.

References

Sources
 Aurora at Internet Movie Database
 Miss Beauty of the World Pageant
 August 2013 Cover
 Victoria's secret
 Modelo revelacion, Caliexposhow 2004
 'Angel colombiano de Victoria's Secret''
 'Elite Model Look, Singapour'
 'Cartagena look 2004'

External links
 Official web page (archived copy)
 

1992 births
Living people
Colombian actresses
Colombian female models
Colombian television personalities